Avtandil Georgievich Koridze (15 April 1935 – 11 April 1966) was a lightweight Greco-Roman wrestler from Georgia who won an Olympic gold medal in 1960 and a world title in 1961. He never won a Soviet title, placing second in 1957 and 1960 and third in 1958.

Koridze took up wrestling in 1949 and in 1957 was included to the Soviet national team. He retired in 1961 and died five years later in a car crash, together with a fellow Olympic wrestler Roman Dzeneladze.

References

External links

1935 births
1966 deaths
Sportspeople from Tbilisi 
Soviet male sport wrestlers
Olympic wrestlers of the Soviet Union
Wrestlers at the 1960 Summer Olympics
Male sport wrestlers from Georgia (country)
Olympic gold medalists for the Soviet Union
Olympic medalists in wrestling
World Wrestling Championships medalists
Medalists at the 1960 Summer Olympics
Burevestnik (sports society) athletes